= Álvaro Ernesto =

Peruvian record producer, DJ

Alvaro Ernesto is a Peruvian record producer, DJ. Born in 1984, he got in touch with different musical expressions, devices and behaviours early on. He started spinning records and dealing with creative processing through various kinds of electronic music at the age of 12.

In 2008, he released his first EPs on the Mexican label BIT Records. He already cooperated with the labels Chillin Music, Documenti Sonori, Gastspiel, among others.
